KLVI (560 AM, "News Talk 560") is a commercial radio station in Beaumont, Texas.  It broadcasts a talk radio format and is owned by iHeartMedia, Inc.  The radio studios and offices are on Dowlen Road in Beaumont, near U.S. Route 69.

By day, KLVI is powered at 5,000 watts non-directional.  But at night, to protect other stations on 560 AM, it uses a directional antenna with a four-tower array.  The transmitter is off Tower Road in Bridge City.

Programming
Weekdays begin with The Morning Show hosted by Al Caldwell, who has been with KLVI for more than four decades.  He is followed by nationally syndicated shows including The Glenn Beck Radio Program, The Clay Travis and Buck Sexton Show, The Sean Hannity Show, The Michael Berry Show, The Ramsey Show with Dave Ramsey, Coast to Coast AM with George Noory and America in the Morning.

Weekends feature shows on health, money, technology and cars.  Syndicated shows include The Kim Komando Show, Somewhere in Time with Art Bell and Live on Sunday Night, It's Bill Cunningham as well as repeats of weekday shows.  Most hours begin with world and national news from Fox News Radio.

History
The station first signed on, as KFDM, on October 1, 1924.  It was the first radio station in Southeast Texas.  In the 1930s, it was owned by the Sabine Broadcasting Company with studios in the million-dollar Hotel Beaumont.  It was powered at 1,000 watts by day and 500 watts at night.

In the 1940s, KFDM was given permission to boost nighttime power to 1,000 watts, same as the daytime.  KLVI became an affiliate of the NBC Blue Network, carrying its dramas, comedies, news, sports, soap operas, game shows and big band broadcasts during the "Golden Age of Radio."  The Blue Network later became ABC Radio.  As network programming moved from radio to television in the 1950s and 1960s, KLVI switched to a full service, middle of the road format of popular adult music, news, talk and sports.

The station was assigned the call sign KLVI by the Federal Communications Commission on December 31, 1963; the call change took place after the radio station came under separate ownership from KFDM-TV. On-air personality Al Caldwell is credited with booking the first public performance ever played by ZZ Top, at a Knights of Columbus hall in Beaumont on February 10, 1970. 
though he was working at crosstown 1450 KAYC at the time.

KLVI was a pop/top40 music station through the middle 70s but flipped to a country format in 1977. Later, it added AM stereo using the Motorola C-QUAM method. In the 1980s, KLVI added more talk programs and reduced the music, as music listening increasingly became the domain of FM radio.  By the 1990s, the station made the full transition to talk radio.  Clear Channel Communications, based in San Antonio, acquired KLVI in 2000.  Clear Channel later switched its name to iHeartMedia, Inc.

References

External links
KLVI NewsTalk 560 official website

News and talk radio stations in the United States
Radio stations established in 1924
1924 establishments in Texas
LVI
IHeartMedia radio stations